is a Japanese film director and screenwriter. He has directed and written many films from 1981 to present day.

Works

Films

Television

References

External links 

 

1961 births
Living people
Japanese film directors
Japanese screenwriters